In mathematics, in the area of complex analysis, Carlson's theorem is a uniqueness theorem which was discovered by Fritz David Carlson. Informally, it states that two different analytic functions which do not grow very fast at infinity can not coincide at the integers. The theorem may be obtained from the Phragmén–Lindelöf theorem, which is itself an extension of the maximum-modulus theorem.

Carlson's theorem is typically invoked to defend the uniqueness of a Newton series expansion. Carlson's theorem has generalized analogues for other expansions.

Statement

  is an entire function of exponential type, meaning that  for some real values , .
 There exists  such that 
  for every non-negative integer .

Then  is identically zero.

Sharpness

First condition

for some real values , .

Second condition

To see that the second condition is sharp, consider the function .

Third condition
Namely, Rubel showed that the conclusion of the theorem remains valid if  vanishes on a subset  of upper density 1, meaning that

This condition is sharp, meaning that the theorem fails for sets  of upper density smaller than 1.

Applications
Suppose  is a function that possesses all finite forward differences .  Consider then the Newton series

By construction, one then has that  for all non-negative integers , so that the difference . This is one of the conditions of Carlson's theorem; if  obeys the others,  then  is identically zero, and the finite differences for  uniquely determine its Newton series. That is, if a Newton series for  exists, and the difference satisfies the Carlson conditions, then  is unique.

See also
Newton series
Mahler's theorem
Table of Newtonian series

References
 F. Carlson, Sur une classe de séries de Taylor, (1914) Dissertation, Uppsala, Sweden, 1914.
 , cor 21(1921) p. 6. 
 
 E.C. Titchmarsh, The Theory of Functions (2nd Ed) (1939) Oxford University Press (See section 5.81)
 R. P. Boas, Jr., Entire functions, (1954) Academic Press, New York.
 
 
 

Factorial and binomial topics
Finite differences
Theorems in complex analysis